Negermusik ("Negro music") was a derogatory term used by the Nazi Party during the Third Reich to demonize musical styles that had been invented by black people such as swing and jazz. The Nazi Party viewed these musical styles as degenerate  works created by an "inferior" race and were therefore prohibited. The term, at that same time, was also applied to indigenous music styles of black Africans.

Nazi Germany 

At the time of the Weimar Republic during 1927, Ernst Krenek's opera of Jonny spielt auf (Jonny Plays) contained jazz musical performances that caused protests among some right-wing ethnic-nationalist groups in Germany at the time. In 1930, the American musician Henry Cowell wrote in the Melos journal that jazz interpreted a mixture of African-American and Jewish elements, stating that:
The fundamentals of jazz are the syncopation and rhythmic accents of the Negro. Their modernization is the work of New York Jews ... So jazz is Negro music seen through the eyes of the Jews.

Such views were readily picked up by the Nazis. Their criticisms have included "gratuitous use of syncopation" and "orgies of drums". More statements from the Nazis included such things as "artistic licentiousness" and "corruption seed in the musical expression" with "indecent dance forms". They went on to scrutinize all modern music of the 1930s as a "political weapon of the Jews". On 4 May 1930, Wilhelm Frick, the Reich's newly appointed Minister of the Interior and Education for Thuringia made a decree called "Against the Negro Culture – For Our German Heritage".

In 1932 the national government under Franz von Papen pandered to the Nazis by banning all public performances by black musicians. After Adolf Hitler gained power in 1933, the Reich's Music Chamber was also created in that same year. This was then followed by a full legal ban on this music on October 12, 1935, across all German national radio. This ban was spearheaded by the German Reich's radio conductor, Eugen Hadamovsky, who purportedly stated:
Mit dem heutigen Tag spreche ich ein endgültiges Verbot des Negerjazz für den gesamten Deutschen Rundfunk aus. (As of today, I decree a definitive ban on the negro jazz for the entire German Radio.).

This exhibition included a poster displaying a cartoon caricature of an African-American male playing on a saxophone with the Star of David on his tuxedo lapel. The overall theme of the exhibition was defamation of contemporary American music as "Negro music" and as another Jewish 'plot' upon German culture.

Swing kids 
The "Swing Kids" (German: Swingjugend) were a group of jazz and swing lovers in Germany in the 1930s, mainly in Hamburg (St. Pauli) and Berlin. They were mainly composed of 14- to 18-year-old boys and girls. They defied the Nazis by listening and dancing to this same banned music in private quarters, clubs, rented halls and vacant cafés. German jazz was offensive to Nazi ideology, because it was often performed by blacks and a number of Jewish musicians. The Swing Kids gave the impression of being apolitical, similar to their zoot suiter counterparts in North America.

On 18 August 1941, in a brutal police operation, over 300 Swing kids were arrested. The measures against them ranged from cutting their hair and sending them back to school under close monitoring, to the deportation of their leaders to Nazi concentration camps.

The 1993 movie Swing Kids gives a fictional portrayal of these same youths in that period in Germany.

World War II 

Prior to the D-Day landings, during the German occupation of the Netherlands, Joseph Goebbels's propaganda ministry published pamphlets written in Dutch named "Greetings from England – The Coming Invasion". These pamphlets contained in-between statements, such as "old jazz-records" and a further full statement declaring "at the celebration of liberation your daughters and wives will be dancing in the arms of real Negroes". This further equated jazz music with 'blackness' during this time to stir up racism and anti-Allied propaganda within occupied Europe. However, Goebbels managed to create a Nazi-sponsored German swing band named Charlie and his Orchestra whose propagandistic purpose was to win over Nazi support and sympathy from British and American listeners through shortwave radio.

Additionally counter-propaganda was used by Allied forces which played upon the fears of the Nazi's banned music. One such example is Glenn Miller, who was a White American jazz musician, that initially provided jazz music, through radio, to Allied combat soldiers for the purposes of entertainment and morale. His same music was used as counter-propaganda by AFN radio broadcasting to denounce fascist oppression in Europe with even Miller once stating himself: "America means freedom, and there's no expression of freedom quite so sincere as music."

Post-War period 
Even in the post-World War II years in 1950s Germany, there were some protests from churches, school authorities and politicians against the "obscene Negro music" of the newly emerging rock 'n' roll genre with such acts like Elvis and Chuck Berry gaining new popularity amongst youth. This attitude also continued right up into the 1960s carrying the same derogatory term that not only maintained its resentment by older generations and conservatives but also was an aggressive defense against a then new contemporary American culture.

See also
 Degenerate music
 Low culture
 Music in Nazi Germany
 Nazism and race
 Persecution of black people in Nazi Germany
 Racial policy of Nazi Germany
 Rhineland Bastard

References

Sources

Further reading
 Mike Zwerin (2000): Swing Under the Nazis: Jazz as a Metaphor for Freedom. Cooper Square Publishers, 
 Clarence Lusane (2003): Hitler's black victims: the historical experiences of Afro-Germans, European Blacks, Africans, and African Americans in the Nazi era. Routledge, p. 200

External links

Ebony | March 1966 | magazine | (p. 111) – Google Books
The Music Survives! Degenerate Music: Music Suppressed by the Third Reich
Melos (1920–1934) – RIPM Journal Information
Music and the Holocaust: Swing Kids Behind Barbed Wire
Circular Breathing: The Cultural Politics of Jazz in Britain (George McKay) – Academia.edu
Django-World War II
Label of love: Blue Note, The Guardian
Offensive English translation of Arnold Schwarzenegger's last name? – Straight Dope Message Board
Is the German word "Neger" a pejorative?

Anti-black racism in Germany
Nazi terminology
Nazi culture
Censorship in Germany
German music history
Censored works
History of jazz
German jazz